Term may refer to:

Terminology, or term, a noun or compound word used in a specific context, in particular:
Technical term, part of the specialized vocabulary of a particular field, specifically:
Scientific terminology, terms used by scientists

Law
Contractual term, a legally binding provision
Payment (or credit) terms, a part of an invoice; when you'll have to pay and what discount you'll get by paying early. Like "2/10 net 30".

Lengths of time
Academic term, a division of the academic year in which classes are held. For English-speaking university academic terms, see:
Easter term
Hilary term
Lent term
Michaelmas term
Summer term
Trinity term
Term of office, the length of time a person serves in a particular office
Term of patent, the maximum period during which a patent can be maintained in force
Term of a pregnancy
Prison sentence, or term, a time served in a prison

Mathematics and physics
Term (logic), a component of a logical or mathematical expression (not to be confused with term logic, or Aristotelian logic)
Ground term, a term with no variables
Addend, or term, an operand to the addition operator
Term of a summation, a polynomial, or a series, a special case of a summand
Term algebra, a freely generated algebraic structure
Term logic, an approach to logic that began with Aristotle and that was dominant until the advent of modern predicate logic
Term symbol, a concept in quantum mechanics

Other uses
Term (architecture) or terminal form, a human head and bust that continues as a square tapering pillar-like form
Term (argumentation), a concept in argumentation theory
Term (computers) or terminal emulator, a program that emulates a video terminal
Term, Iran, a village in Mazandaran Province, Iran
Term life insurance
Telecom Enforcement Resource and Monitoring, an agency of the Indian Department of Telecommunications

See also
Maxterms and minterms, in Boolean algebra
Terme (disambiguation)
Termeh, a type of textile
Tern (disambiguation)